Benedict of Finland may refer to:
 Benedict, Duke of Finland (1254–1291), also Bishop of Linköping
 Benedict, Duke of Halland ( 1330 – c. 1360), also Duke of Finland